This is a list of 132 species in Pristaulacus, a genus of aulacids, ensigns, and gasteruptiids in the Hymenopteran family, Aulacidae.

Pristaulacus species

 Pristaulacus absens Smith, 2005 i c g
 Pristaulacus acutipennis Kieffer, 1910 i c g
 Pristaulacus africanus (Brues, 1924) i c g
 Pristaulacus albitarsatus Sun & Sheng, 2007 g
 Pristaulacus albosignatus (Kieffer, 1911) i c g
 Pristaulacus ambiguus (Schletterer, 1890) i c g
 Pristaulacus angularis (Crosskey, 1953) i c g
 Pristaulacus anijimensis  g
 Pristaulacus annulatus (Kieffer, 1911) i c g
 Pristaulacus arcuatus Kieffer, 1904 i c g
 Pristaulacus arizonicus (Townes, 1950) i c g
 Pristaulacus arozarenae Ortega & Baez, 1985 i c g
 Pristaulacus asiaticus Turrisi & Smith, 2011 g
 Pristaulacus barbeyi (Ferrière, 1933) i c g
 Pristaulacus bicornutus (Schletterer, 1890) i c g
 Pristaulacus bilobatus (Provancher, 1878) i c g
 Pristaulacus boninensis Konishi, 1989 i c g
 Pristaulacus bradleyi (Brues, 1910) i c g
 Pristaulacus brasiliensis (Kieffer, 1911) i c g
 Pristaulacus californicus (Townes, 1950) i c g
 Pristaulacus canadensis (Townes, 1950) i c g
 Pristaulacus capitalis (Schletterer, 1890) i c g
 Pristaulacus caudatus Szépligeti, 1903 i c g
 Pristaulacus chlapowskii Kieffer, 1900 i c g
 Pristaulacus cingulatus (Westwood, 1841) i c g
 Pristaulacus colombianus Smith, 2005 i c g
 Pristaulacus compressus (Spinola, 1808) i c g
 Pristaulacus comptipennis Enderlein, 1912 i c g
 Pristaulacus concolor (Schletterer, 1890) i c g
 Pristaulacus cordatus (Schletterer, 1890) i c g
 Pristaulacus cordiformis (Crosskey, 1953) i c g
 Pristaulacus curryi Jennings, Austin & Stevens, 2004 i c g
 Pristaulacus davisi Jennings, Austin & Stevens, 2004 i c g
 Pristaulacus decemdentatus Kieffer, 1906 i c g
 Pristaulacus disjunctus Kieffer, 1904 i c g
 Pristaulacus duporti Kieffer, 1921 i c g
 Pristaulacus editus (Cresson, 1880) i c g b
 Pristaulacus emarginaticeps Turner, 1922 i c g
 Pristaulacus erythrocephalus Cameron, 1905 i c g
 Pristaulacus excisus (Turner, 1922) i c g
 Pristaulacus fasciatipennis Cameron, 1906 i c g
 Pristaulacus fasciatus (Say, 1829) i c g b
 Pristaulacus femurrubrum Smith, 2005 i c g
 Pristaulacus fiebrigi Brèthes, 1909 i c g
 Pristaulacus flavicrurus (Bradley, 1901) i c g b
 Pristaulacus flavipennis (Cameron, 1887) i c g
 Pristaulacus flavoguttatus (Westwood, 1851) i c g
 Pristaulacus formosus (Westwood, 1868) i c g
 Pristaulacus foxleei (Townes, 1950) i c g b
 Pristaulacus fulvus (Turner, 1918) i c g
 Pristaulacus fuscocostalis Turner, 1918 i c g
 Pristaulacus galitae (Gribodo, 1879) i c g
 Pristaulacus gibbator (Thunberg, 1822) i c g
 Pristaulacus gloriator (Fabricius, 1804) i c g
 Pristaulacus guerini (Westwood, 1851) i c g
 Pristaulacus haemorrhoidalis (Westwood, 1851) i c g
 Pristaulacus haemorrhoidellus (Westwood, 1868) i c g
 Pristaulacus holtzi (Schulz, 1906) i c g
 Pristaulacus holzschuhi Madl, 1990 i c g
 Pristaulacus immaculatus Kieffer, 1904 i c g
 Pristaulacus insularis Konishi, 1990 i c g
 Pristaulacus intermedius Uchida, 1932 i c g
 Pristaulacus iosephi Turrisi & Madl, 2013 g
 Pristaulacus iridipennis (Cameron, 1900) i c g
 Pristaulacus japonicus Turrisi & Watanabe g
 Pristaulacus karinulus Smith, 2001 i c g
 Pristaulacus kiunga Jennings & Austin g
 Pristaulacus kostylevi (Alekseev, 1986) i c g
 Pristaulacus krombeini Smith, 1997 i c g
 Pristaulacus laloki Jennings & Austin g
 Pristaulacus lateritius (Shuckard, 1841) i c g
 Pristaulacus leviceps (Kieffer, 1911) i c g
 Pristaulacus lindae Turrisi, 2000 i c g
 Pristaulacus longicornis Kieffer, 1911 i c g
 Pristaulacus maculatus (Schletterer, 1890) i c g
 Pristaulacus major Szépligeti, 1903 i c g
 Pristaulacus mandibularis Brues, 1933 i c g
 Pristaulacus melleus (Cresson, 1879) i c g b
 Pristaulacus memnonius Sun & Sheng, 2007 g
 Pristaulacus minor (Cresson, 1880) i c g b
 Pristaulacus montanus (Cresson, 1879) i c g b
 Pristaulacus morawitzi (Semenow, 1892) i c g
 Pristaulacus mouldsi Jennings, Austin & Stevens, 2004 i c g
 Pristaulacus mourguesi Maneval, 1935 i c g
 Pristaulacus muticus Kieffer, 1904 i c g
 Pristaulacus niger (Shuckard, 1841) i c g b
 Pristaulacus nigripes Kieffer, 1911 i c g
 Pristaulacus nobilei Turrisi & Smith, 2011 g
 Pristaulacus nobilis (Westwood, 1868) i c g
 Pristaulacus occidentalis (Cresson, 1879) i c g b
 Pristaulacus oregonus (Townes, 1950) i c g
 Pristaulacus ornatus Kieffer, 1913 i c g
 Pristaulacus pacificus (Cresson, 1879) i c g
 Pristaulacus patrati (Audinet-Serville, 1833) i c g
 Pristaulacus pieli Kieffer, 1924 i c g
 Pristaulacus polychromus Kieffer, 1906 i c g
 Pristaulacus porcatus Sun & Sheng, 2007 g
 Pristaulacus praevolans (Brues, 1923) i c g
 Pristaulacus proximus Kieffer, 1906 i c g
 Pristaulacus punctatus Smith, 2005 i c g
 Pristaulacus resutorivorus (Westwood, 1851) i c g b
 Pristaulacus rohweri Brues, 1910 i c g
 Pristaulacus rubidus (Schletterer, 1890) i c g
 Pristaulacus rubriventer (Philippi, 1873) i c g
 Pristaulacus ruficeps (Westwood, 1851) i c g
 Pristaulacus ruficollis (Cameron, 1887) i c g
 Pristaulacus rufipes Enderlein, 1912 i c g
 Pristaulacus rufipilosus Uchida, 1932 i c g
 Pristaulacus rufitarsis (Cresson, 1864) i c g b
 Pristaulacus rufobalteatus (Cameron, 1907) i c g
 Pristaulacus rufus (Westwood, 1841) i c g
 Pristaulacus ryukyuiensis Konishi, 1990 i c g
 Pristaulacus secundus (Cockerell, 1916) i c g
 Pristaulacus sexdentatus Kieffer, 1904 i c g
 Pristaulacus sibiricola (Semenow, 1892) i c g
 Pristaulacus signatus (Shuckard, 1841) i c g
 Pristaulacus spinifer (Westwood, 1868) i c g
 Pristaulacus stephanoides (Westwood, 1841) i c g
 Pristaulacus stigmaterus (Cresson, 1864) i c g
 Pristaulacus stigmaticus (Westwood, 1868) i c g b
 Pristaulacus strangaliae Rohwer, 1917 i c g b
 Pristaulacus superbus Turrisi & Konishi g
 Pristaulacus takakuwai Turrisi & Watanabe g
 Pristaulacus tonkinensis (Turner, 1919) i c g
 Pristaulacus torridus (Bradley, 1908) i c g
 Pristaulacus tricolor Szépligeti, 1903 i c g
 Pristaulacus tridentatus Smith, 2005 i c g
 Pristaulacus tuberculiceps Turner, 1919 i c g
 Pristaulacus variegatus (Shuckard, 1841) i c g
 Pristaulacus violaceus (Bradley, 1905) i c g
 Pristaulacus zhejiangensis He & Ma, 2002 i c g
 Pristaulacus zonatipennis Roman, 1917 i c g

Data sources: i = ITIS, c = Catalogue of Life, g = GBIF, b = Bugguide.net

References

Pristaulacus
Articles created by Qbugbot